Georgi Samokishev (born 25 February 1987 in Gotse Delchev) is a Bulgarian football player who currently plays for Pirin Gotse Delchev. He is a reliable defender.

Career
Samokishev was educated in Pirin's youth academy, and played 13 league games for the club before moving on to have lengthy spells with Lokomotiv Plovdiv and Slavia Sofia. On 25 August 2009, it was announced that Samokishev would return to Pirin in a week. A few days later, he signed a 2-year contract with Nevrokopchanlii.

References

1987 births
Living people
Bulgarian footballers
Association football defenders
First Professional Football League (Bulgaria) players
OFC Pirin Blagoevgrad players
PFC Pirin Blagoevgrad players
PFC Lokomotiv Plovdiv players
PFC Slavia Sofia players
PFC Pirin Gotse Delchev players